The 1957 Volta a Catalunya was the 37th edition of the Volta a Catalunya cycle race and was held from 1 September to 8 September 1957. The race started in Montjuïc and finished in Barcelona. The race was won by Jesús Loroño.

General classification

References

1957
Volta
1957 in Spanish road cycling
September 1957 sports events in Europe